Zeldovich–Taylor flow (also known as Zeldovich–Taylor expansion wave) is the fluid motion of gaseous detonation products behind Chapman–Jouguet detonation wave. The flow was described independently by Yakov Zeldovich in 1942 and G. I. Taylor in 1950, although G. I. Taylor carried out the work in 1941 that being circulated in the British Ministry of Home Security. Since naturally occurring detonation waves are in general a Chapman–Jouguet detonation wave, the solution becomes very useful in describing real-life detonation waves.

Mathematical description
Consider a spherically outgoing Chapman–Jouguet detonation wave propagating with a constant velocity . By definition, immediately behind the detonation wave, the gas velocity is equal to the local sound speed  with respect to the wave. Let  be the radial velocity of the gas behind the wave, in a fixed frame. For , the gas velocity must be zero at the center  and should take the value  at the detonation location . The fluid motion is governed by the inviscid Euler equations

The last equation implies that the flow is isentropic and hence we can write .

Since there are no length or time scales involved in the problem, one may look for a self-similar solution of the form , where . The first two equations then become

This leads to

For polytropic gases with constant specific heats, we have . The above set of equations cannot be solved analytically, but has to be integrated numerically. The solution has to be found for the range  subjected to the condition  at  

The region between the detonation front and the trailing weak discontinuity is the rarefaction (or expansion) flow. Interior to the weak discontinuity  everywhere.

Location of the weak discontinuity
From the second equation described above, it follows that when , .

The left hand side of the above equation can become positive infinity only if . Thus, when  decreases to the value , the gas comes to rest (Here  is the sound speed corresponding to ).

Behavior near the weak discontinuity
Rewrite the second equation as

In the neighborhood of the weak discontinuity, the quantities to the first order (such as ) reduces the above equation to

At this point, it is worth mentioning that in general, disturbances in gases are propagated with respect to the gas at the local sound speed. In other words, in the fixed frame, the disturbances are propagated at the speed  (the other possibility is  although it is of no interest here). This is just a normal sound wave propagation. If however  is non-zero but a small quantity, then one find the correction for the disturbance propagation speed as  obtained using a Taylor series expansion, where  is a necessarily a positive constant (for ideal gas, where  is the specific heat ratio). This means that the above equation can be written as

whose solution is

where  is a constant. This determines  implicitly in the neighborhood of the week discontinuity where  is small.

which implies that  if  is a small quantity. It can be shown that the relation  not only holds for small , but throughout the rarefaction wave.

Behavior near the detonation front
First let us show that the relation  is not only valid near the weak discontinuity, but throughout the region. If this inequality is not maintained, then there must be a point where  between the weak discontinuity and the detonation front. The second governing equation implies that at this point  must be infinite or, . Let us obtain  by taking the second derivative of the governing equation. In the resulting equation, impose the condition  to obtain . This implies that  reaches a maximum at this point which in turn implies that  cannot exist for  greater than the maximum point considered since otherwise  would be multi-valued. The maximum point at most can be corresponded to the outer boundary (detonation front). This means that  can vanish only on the boundary and it is already shown that  is positive near the weak discontinuity,  is positive everywhere in the region except the boundaries where it can vanish. 

Note that near the detonation front, we must satisfy the condition . For a detonation front, the condition  must always be met, with the equality sign representing Chapman–Jouguet detonations and the inequalities representing over-driven detonations. The analysis describing the point  must correspond to the detonation front.

See also
Taylor–von Neumann–Sedov blast wave
Guderley–Landau–Stanyukovich problem

References

Flow regimes
Fluid dynamics
Combustion
Hyperbolic partial differential equations